Plethodontohyla tuberata is a species of frog in the family Microhylidae.
It is endemic to Madagascar.
Its natural habitats are subtropical or tropical moist montane forests, subtropical or tropical high-altitude shrubland, subtropical or tropical high-altitude grassland, arable land, plantations, rural gardens, and heavily degraded former forest.
It is threatened by habitat loss.

References

Plethodontohyla
Endemic frogs of Madagascar
Taxonomy articles created by Polbot
Amphibians described in 1883
Taxa named by Wilhelm Peters